Denver is a borough in Lancaster County, Pennsylvania. The population was 3,794 at the 2020 census, down from 3,861 at the 2010 census.

History
Denver was founded by in 1735, by Hans Bucher, a Swiss immigrant. It was originally known as Bucher's Thal, or "Bucher Valley", in reference to the adjacent Cocalico Creek. In the mid-18th century, a gristmill was built along the creek ,and by 1772 six dwellings had been built. A blacksmith shop and a sawmill were operating by 1820. Early advantages for the settlement were fertile soils and the limestone formations that were mined for the manufacture of mortar, plaster and whitewash. In the 1830s, settler John Bucher became an advocate for using the lime as a fertilizer. Several limestone quarries were in turn operating by the 1850s. 

During the Civil War, the Reading and Columbia Railroad built a line through town, prompting a name change to "Union Station". With time, residents grew weary being referred to as a train station. After researching post offices in the country, Adam Brubaker found only one named Denver. On November 1, 1881, the town was officially renamed Denver.

By the late 19th century, continued growth had some residents considering incorporating as a borough. The tipping point was a major fire at the Denver House, a tavern built behind the train station in 1868. Water from a local well and the nearby Cocalico Creek was insufficient to fight the fire, prompting tobacco merchant Aaron Shirk, physician W.D. Fink and businessman Ephraim Renninger to press for incorporation, so a municipal water system could be created. The trio filed an application for incorporation in April 1900, and by that December, Denver Borough had come into being. It originally encompassed , about a quarter its current size.

With the turn of the century, the new borough purchased a reservoir site and constructed a water plant, which went online in 1902. By 1906, the one quarry still in operation today just outside Denver was opened in 1906 by Abram G. Kurtz. Around the time Denver was incorporated, cigar making was the dominant industry in the area, but mechanization eventually doomed the trade in hand-rolling cigars. New industries sprouted up, including the F&M Hat Company, founded in 1912 by brothers Samuel and Daniel Fichthorn along with their brother-in-law Ambrose Marburger. F&M Hat quickly grew into the town's largest employer, giving generations of residents jobs in its factory. By 1939 there were 835 employees working two shifts.

In 1977, the Cocalico Eagles boys basketball team, under the direction of coach Ed McIlmoyle, defeated Mercer, 75-59, in the PIAA Class AA state championship game.

Bucher's Mill Covered Bridge, south of Denver near Reamstown, was listed on the National Register of Historic Places in 1980.

Geography
Denver is located in northeastern Lancaster County at  (40.233859, -76.137088). It is bordered to the southeast by Reamstown and to the southwest by Stevens. Interstate 76, the Pennsylvania Turnpike, passes through the northern side of the borough, with the closest access  to the east at Exit 286 (U.S. Route 222).

Denver sits in a valley formed by Cocalico Creek to the west and Little Cocalico Creek to the east; the two creeks join at the southern border of the borough. Cocalico Creek is a tributary of the Conestoga River and part of the Susquehanna watershed.

Demographics

As of the census of 2010, there were 15,391 people, 5,507 households, and 4,204 families living in the 17517 zip code. The population density was 11,839.2 people per square mile (4571.1/km²). There were 5,705 housing units at an average density of 4388.5 per square mile (1694.4/km²). The racial makeup of the borough was 96.5% White, 1.2% Black or African American, 2.2% Asian, 0.03% Pacific Islander, 0.8% from other races, and 1.1% from two or more races. 2.28% of the population were Hispanic or Latino of any race.

There were 5,507 households, out of which 36.5% had children under the age of 18 living with them, 61.4% were married couples living together, 8.5% had a female householder with no husband present, and 25.4% were non-families. 21.1% of all households were made up of individuals, and 8.5% had someone living alone who was 65 years of age or older. The average household size was 2.63 and the average family size was 3.04.

In the borough the population was spread out, with 26.5% under the age of 18, 8.0% from 18 to 24, 24.1% from 25 to 44, 27.2% from 45 to 64, and 14.2% who were 65 years of age or older. The median age was 38.7 years. For every 100 females there were 98.2 males. For every 100 females age 18 and over, there were 98.1 males.

From the 2000 Census, The median income for a household in the borough was $49,085, and the median income for a family was $53,125. Males had a median income of $36,250 versus $23,715 for females. The per capita income for the borough was $19,706. About 4.5% of families and 5.2% of the population were below the poverty line, including 5.4% of those under age 18 and 3.3% of those age 65 or over.

Education
Denver Borough is served by the Cocalico School District.

Elementary
 | Denver Elementary (Cocalico School District)

Middle
 | Cocalico Middle (Cocalico School District)

High
 | Cocalico High (Cocalico School District)

References

External links

Denver Fair

Populated places established in 1863
Boroughs in Lancaster County, Pennsylvania
1863 establishments in Pennsylvania